HDMS Herluf Trolle (F353) was a  in the Royal Danish Navy which was in use until 1990. The ship is named after Herluf Trolle, a 15th-century Danish admiral.

Construction and career
She was laid down on 18 December 1964 and launched on 8 September 1965 by Helsingør Skinsværft, Elsinore. Commissioned on 16 April 1967.

Herluf Trolle was an innovative design using a hybrid propulsion system, a combined gas turbine and diesel approach (CODOG). Herluf Trolle underwent significant refit in 1970 and a midlife update 1977–78.

During Kiel Week on 20 June 1970, she participated with multiple other German vessels.

She suffered a serious engine room fire in 1982 and was repaired by 1983.

Herluf Trolle was placed in reserve in 1987, decommissioned in 1990 and sold for auction in 1992. She was scrapped in Belgium in 1995.

Gallery

See also

References

External links

Peder Skram-class frigates
Ships built in Helsingør
1967 ships
Frigates of the Cold War